

Xeon DP, Dual Core

"Sossaman" (65 nm) 
 Based on Enhanced Pentium M microarchitecture
 All models support: MMX, SSE, SSE2, SSE3, Demand Based Switching (Intel's Server EIST), XD bit (an NX bit implementation), Intel VT-x
 All models support dual-processor configurations
 Die size: 90.3 mm²
 Steppings: C0, D0

Sources 
 
 

Intel Xeon (Pentium M)